Charles Garland Lewis (April 27, 1912 – December 6, 2009) was an American professional basketball player. He played for the Indianapolis Kautskys in the National Basketball League in one game during the 1939–40 season. He would later work as an athletic director and head boys' basketball coach for San Marino High School in San Marino, California.

References

1912 births
2009 deaths
American men's basketball players
Basketball players from Indiana
Forwards (basketball)
High school basketball coaches in California
Indianapolis Kautskys players
Kentucky Wildcats men's basketball players
People from Jackson County, Indiana